Vpro, vpro or VPRO may refer to:

 VPRO, a Dutch broadcasting organisation (originally Vrijzinnig Protestantse Radio Omroep)
 Intel vPro, a set of features built into computer motherboards and other hardware
 SGI VPro, a series of Silicon Graphics graphics adapters